Sergey Kudinov (born 29 June 1991) is a Russian handball player for C' Chartres MHB and the Russian national team.

References

1991 births
Living people
Russian male handball players
Sportspeople from Astrakhan